Pella is a municipality in the Pella regional unit of Macedonia, Greece. The capital of the municipality is Giannitsa, the largest town of the regional unit. On the site of the ancient city of Pella is the Archaeological Museum of Pella.

Municipality
The municipality Pella was formed at the 2011 local government reform by the merger of the following 5 former municipalities, that became municipal units:
Giannitsa
Krya Vrysi
Kyrros
Megas Alexandros
Pella (town)

The municipality has an area of 669.220 km2, the municipal unit 113.819 km2.
The municipality has a population of 63,122 (2011 census). The capital of the municipality of Pella is Giannitsa (population 29,789 at the 2011 census). Other towns are Krya Vrysi (pop. 6,535), Mylotopos (pop. 2,605), Pella (town) (pop. 2,450), Galatades (pop. 2,339), Karyotissa (pop. 1,999), Aravissos (pop. 1,800), Ampeleíai (pop. 1,095), Melíssion (983), Pentaplátanon (956), and Paralímni (816).

Famous people
Alexander the Great (356–323BC) King of Macedon at its height
Philip II of Macedon Father of Alexander the great and king of Macedon from 359 BC until his assassination in 336 BC.
Krste Misirkov (1874–1926), a philologist and publicist.

See also
Archaeological Museum of Pella

References

Municipalities of Central Macedonia

ar:بيلا، بيلا